The Calgary Kangaroos is an Australian rules football club based in Calgary, Alberta, Canada.  They welcome all new players, regardless of prior experience, practice at A E Cross High School in Glamorgan, play games at the Inland Athletic Park and are members of AFL Canada. The Roos also run introductory training sessions at various elementary and high schools across the city, in an effort to grow the sport locally. The current number one ticket holder of the club is former Calgary City Mayor, the Honourable Naheed Nenshi

The Calgary Kangaroos regular season consists of a series of home and away games between the three (3) Metro teams the Bears, Cowboys and Wolves. The Wolves team were created in 2015 owing to the growth of the club, and went on to win the Calgary Metro Championship in their inaugural year. During the season there are trips to Banff, Vancouver, Kelowna and Edmonton. The trip to Edmonton is to play for the Capitol Cup in addition to hosting the Stampede Cup locally.

The Calgary Kangaroos are Canada's most successful football club having been a regular feature in the USAFL National Championships finals. The Roo's were Division Two runners up in 2008, and then went on to win back-to-back Division Two titles in 2009 and 2010, earning a Division One promotion. In 2011, Calgary played their way through to the Grand Final, but lost to a more accurate Denver 3.2.20 to 0.5.5. The less said about 2012 the better. In 2013, Calgary again played its way into the Division One Grand Final, being beaten by the home team, Austin Crows 4.2.26 to 4.1.25.

In 2014, the Roos had 13 Canadian players selected to represent Team Canada in both the men's and women's competitions at the 2014 AFL International Cup in Melbourne, Australia.

Team Awards

Bears

Cowboys

Wolves

Club Awards

Coach of The Year

Umpire of The Year

Troy Rose Award

Championship Results

Calgary Champions

USAFL (United States Australian Football League)

See also

References

External links
 Calgary Kangaroos
 Calgary Kookaburras
 AFL Canada
 USAFL

Kangaroos
Australian rules football clubs established in 2002
2002 establishments in Alberta
Australian rules football clubs in Canada